Reina Miyauchi (Miyauchi Reina, 宮内玲奈, born January 6, 1978) is a J-pop singer from Okinawa, Japan, and current member of the group MAX.  She made her debut with the group Super Monkey's on 25 January 1995, and then, after the departure of Namie Amuro, she formed the group MAX with the remaining group members.

See also 
 Super Monkey's
 MAX

References

1978 births
Living people
People from Okinawa Prefecture
Musicians from Okinawa Prefecture
21st-century Japanese singers
21st-century Japanese women singers
Ryukyuan people